Lhasa Nunatak is a narrow rock ridge,  long, trending in a northwest–southeast direction between Snakeskin Glacier and Jensen Glacier, to the east of the Supporters Range, Antarctica. It was so named by the New Zealand Geological Survey Antarctic Expedition (1961–62) because the central peak resembles a Tibetan monastery perched on top of a hill, as at Lhasa.

References

Ridges of the Ross Dependency
Dufek Coast